Heikki Laine (born October 17. 1983) is a Finnish former professional ice hockey forward.

Lanie played 106 regular season games in the Finnish Liiga with HIFK, JYP and Espoo Blues.

References

External links

1983 births
Living people
Espoo Blues players
Étoile Noire de Strasbourg players
HC Salamat players
HIFK (ice hockey) players
JYP Jyväskylä players
Kiekko-Vantaa players
Ice hockey people from Helsinki
Finnish ice hockey right wingers